Squalus notocaudatus, the bartail spurdog, is a dogfish of the family Squalidae, found on the continental shelf off Queensland, Australia, at depths between 220 and 450 m. Its reproduction is ovoviviparous .

References

notocaudatus
Fauna of Queensland
Marine fish of Eastern Australia
Fish described in 2007
Taxa named by Peter R. Last
Taxa named by William Toby White
Taxa named by John D. Stevens